My Drunk Kitchen is a cooking show and comedy series of short videos created and posted on YouTube by content creator Hannah Hart beginning in March 2011. The series features Hart, a San Franciscan proofreader living in Los Angeles, typically attempting to cook or bake various dishes, or otherwise engaging in some food-related activity, all while imbibing large quantities of alcoholic beverages. Most episodes have their own recipe, and occasionally a corresponding beverage. The series has been praised for its drunk humor, catchphrases, and the use of jump cut editing. Hart's YouTube channel has 2.4 million subscribers.

Episodes

Season 1

Season 2
This season marked the beginning of the series being shot in HD.

While the second season continued featuring her drunk antics, Hannah accompanied "My Drunk Kitchen" with a series of videos titled "Coming Out".

Towards the end of the second season, Hannah used Indiegogo to raise $25,000 within a month in order to kick-start her roadshow, "Hello, Harto!". She successfully raised $36,000 in four hours and made plans to continue filming My Drunk Kitchen on the road. While the roadshow featured Hannah's comedy skits, the show was also used to attract viewers to help volunteer in local food operations.

After Hannah announced her roadshow, videos were no longer formally organized into seasons.

2013

Specials

Awards and nominations

Spin-offs
In addition to My Drunk Kitchen, Hart has also posted a series of videos, "Advice from the Hart", answering viewer questions or requests for advice.

References

External links
 

YouTube original programming
Cooking web series
Drinking culture
2011 web series debuts
Streamy Award-winning channels, series or shows
American LGBT-related web series
American non-fiction web series